Life Jothe Ondh Selfie is a 2018 Indian Kannada-language romantic drama film directed by Dinakar Thoogudeepa and written by his wife Manasa Dinakar. Produced by Samruddhi Manjunath under Viraat Sai Creations banner, the film released across Karnataka, India on 24 August 2018. Starring Prem Kumar, Prajwal Devaraj and Hariprriya, the film also features Dhananjay and Sudharani in a supporting role. The film score and  soundtrack is composed by V. Harikrishna and the cinematography is by A. R. Niranjan Babu. The film travels along the journey of the three friends who face different situations as they travel along.

Plot
Nakul is a software engineer, who aspires to be a director like Mani Ratnam and Puttanna Kanagal, but due to pressure mounted by his family, He leaves his house for a feel-good trip to Goa. 
At Goa, He meets Rashmi aka Rash, a drunkard-but-independent woman and Virat, an honest-young man during the trip where they unknowingly reach at an isolated island. They share their life stories about each other: Rash reveals her issues with his would-be-fiancée Karthik's mother and learns Karthik's first priority is his mother and not her, Thus she leaves for Goa. Virat reveals that his father is an industrialist, but has made his mother Tulasi as a cook in his house and married another woman. It is revealed Virat is the illegitimate son of the industrialist and Tulasi actually became a cook as she didn't want Virat to lead a poor-burden life.

When his fiancée humiliated Tulasi, He gets enraged and leaves the house. They become friends where Nakul reunites Virat and Tulasi. They all enjoy their trip by playing watersports where Rash clears the misunderstandings with Karthik and the couple reunite. Nakul, Virat and Rash encourages Tulasi to participate in a cooking competition as she has a good taste in food. Though reluctant, Tulasi agrees and participates where she wins the competition and delivers a speech about the difficulties of a woman, which makes the industrialist realize his mistake and accepts Tulasi as his wife.

Cast
 Prem Kumar as Nakul
 Prajwal Devaraj as Virat
 Hariprriya as Rash alias Rashmi
 Raj Deepak Shetty as Industrialist, Virat's father
 Sudharani as Thulsi, Virat's mother
Dhananjay as Karthik, Rash's fiancée
Sadhu Kokila as John

Soundtrack

V. Harikrishna has composed the songs for the film under his own audio label Dbeats. The lyrics for the songs are written by Kaviraj, V. Nagendra Prasad and Yogaraj Bhat. The audio was released in June 2018.

References

External links
 
 

2018 films
2010s Kannada-language films
Indian buddy films
Films shot in Goa
2010s drama road movies
Indian drama road movies
Indian coming-of-age films
Films scored by V. Harikrishna
2018 drama films
Films directed by Dinakar Thoogudeepa